Learning to Lie is a German film released in 2003. It is based on the novel of Frank Goosen from the year 2000.

Plot 
Beginning in West Germany in 1982, 18-year-old school boy Helmut falls in love with fellow pupil Britta. He starts working for a Peace movement to get to know Britta. Britta, however, suddenly moves to San Francisco to live with her father and whilst there, finds a new boyfriend. Helmut studies literature and politics in his home town and has a relationship with another girl from his former school, now studying medicine on the same university but they break up after having an affair with her roommate. Helmut begins a lot of short affairs with different women but still searches for his first girl.

Years later, in 1989, the Berlin wall falls and the Cold war ends. Helmut is lying in his girlfriend's bed when his old school friend Mücke calls him, who saw Britta in Berlin. Helmut hurries to Berlin and finds Britta, but she has changed and has become arrogant. Mücke tells him afterwards that he had an affair with Britta and that Britta has had a lot of affairs. Worried by this, Helmut begins a lot of new affairs and his parents get divorced at that time. 
In 1998, Helmut settles down with a girl who wants a baby with him, but Helmut travels one more time to Berlin to meet Britta for one last time.

The novel 
The film is based on the novel Liegen lernen by Frank Goosen from the year 2000. While the novel takes place in Bochum, the film was set in Düsseldorf. The novel has a lot of biographical moments from Goosen, but the story is typical for a West German youth in the 1980s.  The novel became very popular through the great '80s revival in western Germany around the year 2000.

Cast
 Fabian Busch as Helmut
 Susanne Bormann as Britta
 Fritzi Haberlandt as Gisela
 Sophie Rois as Barbara
 Anka Sarstedt as Gloria
 Birgit Minichmayr as Tina
 Florian Lukas as Mücke
 Tino Mewes as the long Schäfer
 Sebastian Münster as Beck
 Beate Abraham as Helmut's Mother
 Wilfried Dziallas as Helmut's father
 Uwe Rohde as Uwe
 André Meyer as Rüdiger
 Jean Pierre Cornut as Professor Mutter
 Heinz Schubert as Uncle Bertram

Crew
 Direction: Hendrik Handloegten
 Script: Frank Goosen and Hendrik Handloegten
 Production: Maria Köpf
 Music: Dieter Schleip
 Camera: Florian Hoffmeister
 Editing: Elena Bromund

References

External links
 
 moviemess
 

2003 films
German romantic comedy-drama films
Films set in the 1980s
Films set in the 1990s
Films set in Berlin
Films set in Germany
Films set in West Germany
Films based on German novels
Films shot in Cologne
Films shot in Berlin
2000s German films